Donald Carpenter may refer to:

 Donald M. Carpenter (1894–1940), United States Navy naval aviator
 Donald F. Carpenter (1899–1985), American businessman
 Donald Carpenter (singer), singer with Submersed
 Don Carpenter (electrical engineer), professor of electrical engineering at Stanford University

See also
 Don Carpenter (1931–1995), American writer